Tecmo Bowl Throwback is a video game released by Koei Tecmo for the Xbox 360 via Xbox Live Arcade. The PlayStation 3 version was released via the PlayStation Network store on June 1, 2010, followed by the iOS version on May 26, 2011. The game is an update of the 1993 version of Tecmo Super Bowl. Due to Electronic Arts obtaining the exclusive NFL and NFLPA licenses in 2004 for the Madden NFL series, the game used generic team and player names.

Gameplay
The gameplay retains the classic feel of the series, which the ESRB described as a "top-down arcade-style football game in which players compete against teams around the world to become the 'International Tecmo Bowl Champion'", with "animated cutscenes".

Key features
 Updated 3D graphics and user interface improvements
 Player and team name editor
 Online play
 Season play (three total seasons)
The ability to switch between 3D and 2D graphics by pressing the R button.

Reception

The game received "mixed or average reviews" on all platforms according to the review aggregation website Metacritic.

References

External links
 

2010 video games
IOS games
Multiplayer and single-player video games
PlayStation 3 games
PlayStation Network games
Southend Interactive games
Tecmo Bowl
Video games developed in Sweden
Xbox 360 Live Arcade games
Xbox 360 games